Cheffia  is a town and commune in El Taref Province, Algeria. According to the 1998 census it has a population of 7,450.

The Cheffia valley was described in 1868 by Reboud as being comprised between the eastern slope of the Bou Habet and a series of grassy knolls where a few gardens and clumps of azeroliers stand here and there. It is a valley which measures from north to south about fifteen kilometres and five kilometres wide. It is divided into two basins by the cultivated plateau of Sidi-Bou-Aoun, which has large stones.

History

Cheffia is the site of the Roman city of Thullium in the Province of Numidia. The Cheffia valley contains a number of ruins that can be considered as Libyan necropolises. Reboud describes a number thereof, and their Lybic (Libyco-Berber) inscriptions, and published the map shown in this article. The region was slow to christianize, with Thullium not receiving its first bishop until the end of the fifth century; a bishop from there was present at the Council of Carthage in 525.

Notable people 
Boudjemaa Talai (1952–2022), politician

References

Communes of El Taref Province
El Taref Province